Harlow Hill may refer to:

Harlow Hill, Harrogate, an area of Harrogate, North Yorkshire, England
Harlow Hill, Northumberland, a village in England

See also
Harlow (disambiguation)
Harrow Hill (disambiguation)